Po Leung Kuk Choi Kai Yau School (abbreviated PLKCKY) is a private independent school for boys and girls aged 6–18, ranging from primary through to International Baccalaureate (IB) diploma students. Situated in Sham Shui Po , Hong Kong (previously in Tin Hau prior to 2009), PLKCKY is a school with approximately 1,300 students. The school opened and moved into its new campus in September 2009. The teacher to student ratio is 1:10. Approximately 60% of teachers at PLKCKY are western, while the other 40% are Chinese.

Education

This school is divided into primary and secondary sections, in which primary consists of 5 years while secondary has 7 years. This is different to many schools (especially local).  This is has been explained by the founding principal, saying, "We want to let students have a secondary experience earlier on."

Alumni
Natalie Kan Cheuk Tong, Hong Kong swimmer
Jocelyn Wong Chin Yau, Hong Kong table tennis player
Gareth T (Gareth Tong Ling Shan), Hong Kong singer and music producer

References

External links

 Po Leung Kuk Choi Kai Yau School
 Po Leung Kuk

Primary schools in Hong Kong
Secondary schools in Hong Kong
International Baccalaureate schools in Hong Kong
Po Leung Kuk
2002 establishments in Hong Kong